is a railway station on the Rikuu East Line in the city of Ōsaki, Miyagi Prefecture, Japan, operated by East Japan Railway Company (JR East).

Lines
Nishi-Furukawa Station is served by the Rikuu East Line, and is located 15.9 rail kilometers from the terminus of the line at Kogota Station.

Station layout
Nishi-Furukawa Station has one island platform, connected to the station building by a footbridge. The station is unattended.

Platforms

History
The station name was changed to its present name on 1 April 1957. The station was absorbed into the JR East network upon the privatization of JNR on April 1, 1987.

Surrounding area
  Route 347

See also
 List of Railway Stations in Japan

External links

  

Railway stations in Miyagi Prefecture
Rikuu East Line
Railway stations in Japan opened in 1913
Ōsaki, Miyagi
Stations of East Japan Railway Company